Wu Qiang (born 15 August 1993) is a Chinese rower.

She won a medal at the 2019 World Rowing Championships.

References

External links

1993 births
Living people
Chinese female rowers
World Rowing Championships medalists for China
Asian Games medalists in rowing
Rowers at the 2018 Asian Games
Asian Games gold medalists for China
Medalists at the 2018 Asian Games
20th-century Chinese women
21st-century Chinese women